Miguel Pesce Thiré (born July 8, 1982) is a Brazilian actor.

Biography
Thiré was born in Rio de Janeiro, Brazil. He is the son of actor Cecil Thiré with theater producer Norma Thiré, brother of the actors Luísa Thiré and Carlos Thiré and also of the musician João Thiré, grandchildren of the actress Tônia Carrero and the artist Carlos Arthur Thiré.

He currently lives in Portugal since the beginning of the 2016 recording of the telenovela "A Impostora" on TVI, the leading audience channel in Portugal.

Filmography

Television

Film

Stage

References

External links

1982 births
Living people
Male actors from Rio de Janeiro (city)
Brazilian people of French descent
Brazilian people of Italian descent
Brazilian male television actors
Brazilian male film actors
Brazilian male stage actors
Brazilian emigrants to Portugal